AirNet is an American Part 135 cargo airline based in Franklin County, Ohio, USA, near Columbus. It specializes in delivery of documents and small packages. Banks were once their main client, transporting checks for over 300 of the country's largest banks. With the passing of the Check 21 Act, and the increase in the usage of electronic banking, this has been greatly reduced. AirNet is now focusing on time critical documents and packages, such as those required in the scientific and medical field. The main sort facility is located at Rickenbacker International Airport in Columbus. In September 2008, AirNet announced that they were moving their sort facility to Chicago, reducing the number of aircraft, and redesigning their route network. Their corporate headquarters remains in Columbus.

History 
Financial Air Express / PDQ was founded in 1974 by Gerald Mercer in Pontiac, MI. Jet Courier was founded at about the same time by Donald Wright in Cincinnati, OH. Jet Courier changed its name to Wright International Express in January 1985.  In July 1988, these two companies merged to become US Check Airlines, headed by Gerald Mercer. US Check acquired Air Continental of Norwalk, OH a year later to become a dominant player in the cancelled check transportation industry. US Check later acquired Midway Aviation of Dallas, TX, Pacific Air Charter of San Diego, CA, Express Convenience Center of Southfield, Massachusetts and Data Air Courier of Chicago, Illinois.

In order to raise additional capital and further grow the company, US Check went public in 1998 to become AirNet Systems. In 2008, AirNet Systems was purchased by Bayside Capital, which had once owned the now defunct Flight Express of Orlando, FL.
In August 2015 Kalitta Charters acquired AirNet.

Destinations
AirNet's destinations:

Fleet 
The Airnet Express fleet consists of the following aircraft:

Accident 
An AirNet Beechcraft Baron was lost in a crash on 8 January 2022 near Defiance, Missouri, killing the two occupants. The plane had been traveling to Centennial Airport in Colorado.

Gallery

References

External links
AirNet

Regional Airline Association members
Cargo airlines of the United States
Airlines established in 1974
Companies based in the Columbus, Ohio metropolitan area
Regional airlines of the United States
Airlines based in Ohio
1974 establishments in Ohio